Thylacodes variabilis is a species of worm snail common in the rocky intertidal in Hawaiʻi and the tropical Pacific.

References

External links
 Hadfield, M. G. & Kay, E. A. In: Hadfield, M.G., Kay, E.A, Gillette, M.U. & Lloyd, M.C. (1972). The Vermetidae (Mollusca: Gastropoda) of the Hawaiian Islands. Marine Biology. 12(1): 81-98

Vermetidae